Abdul Haseeb Khan (Urdu: عبدل حسیب خان) is a Pakistani Politician and a Member of Senate of Pakistan.

Political career
In March 2009 he was elected to the Senate of Pakistan on general seat as MQM candidate. He is member of Senate committee of National Health Services, Regulations and Coordination, Information Technology and Telecommunication 
Commerce and Textile Industry, Industries and Production and Employees Welfare Fund.

See also
 List of Senators of Pakistan
 Ayatullah Durrani
 Hafiz Hamdullah

References

Living people
Muhajir people
Members of the Senate of Pakistan
Muttahida Qaumi Movement politicians
Year of birth missing (living people)